Kargi may refer to:

 Kargi, Estonia, a village in Estonia
 Kargi, Hormozgan, a village in Iran
 Kargı, Çorum, a district in Çorum Province, Turkey
 Kargı, Mecitözü, a village in Mecitözü District, Çorum Province, Turkey
 Kargı, Osmancık, a village in Osmancık District, Çorum Province, Turkey
 Kargı, Beypazarı, a village in Ankara Province, Turkey
 Kargı, Bucak, a village in Burdur Province, Turkey
 Karğı, Çine, a village in Aydın Province, Turkey
 Kargı Dam, a dam in Eskişehir Province, Turkey
 Yahya Galip Kargı (1874–1942), Turkish politician
 Kargi, Kenya, a village in Kenya

See also 
 Khargi
 Karge (disambiguation)